Peggy Johnson currently serves as the chief executive officer (CEO) of Magic Leap, succeeding Rony Abovitz in Sept 2020. Before joining Magic Leap, she held the position of Executive Vice President of Business Development at Microsoft.

Education 
Johnson has a BS degree in Electrical Engineering from San Diego State University.

Career 
After college, Johnson joined General Electric as Engineer in their Military Electronics division.

Johnson later joined Qualcomm, starting out as Engineer who often traveled with business teams to translate technical details of a solution for customers. She eventually transitioned from her technical role to a business role within Qualcomm.

At Qualcomm, she worked on cutting-edge technologies including mobile connectivity and app stores.

After 24 years at Qualcomm, she joined Microsoft as Executive Vice-President of Business Development. Microsoft paid Johnson a US$7.8 million signing bonus. In this role, she drove business deals and partnerships for the Company.

In August of 2020, Johnson joined Magic Leap as Chief Executive Officer.

Awards and recognition 
In 2016, Business Insider recognized Johnson as #2 among the most powerful women engineers in the world and Silicon Republic recognized her as #14 among the most powerful women leading tech around the world.

In 2017, Business Insider recognized her as the most powerful female engineer in the United States.

Johnson was inducted into the Women in Technology International Hall of Fame in 2013 and named one of the top 100 women leaders in STEM in 2012 by STEMconnector.

Personal life 
Peggy Johnson is married and has three children.

References

External links 
 

American businesspeople
Living people
San Diego State University alumni
Date of birth missing (living people)
Year of birth missing (living people)